Second Lieutenant David Cuthbert Thomas (1895 – 18 March 1916) was a Welsh soldier of the British Army who served during the First World War. He is best known for his association with the poet Siegfried Sassoon, who after his death became the subject of some of the greatest war poems by Sassoon and Robert Graves.

Biography
Thomas was the son of Evan and Ethelinda Thomas of Llanedi Rectory, Pontarddulais, Glamorgan, and was educated at Christ College, Brecon. His first commission was as a second lieutenant in the 3rd Battalion, Royal Welch Fusiliers. That regiment also included the writers Robert Graves and Siegfried Sassoon, with whom he became close friends. After training, Thomas was posted to the regiment's 1st Battalion, which was then serving on the Western Front and attached to the 22nd Brigade, itself part of the 7th Infantry Division. On 18 March 1916 Thomas was leading a working party to repair wire emplacements in no man's land at the Citadel, near Fricourt in France when he was shot in the throat. He then walked to a first aid post for treatment but died soon afterwards after he began choking. He is buried at New Military Cemetery at Fricourt (reference D3 in Point 110). Graves wrote the poem 'Not Dead' in Thomas's memory and Thomas also appears in Graves' autobiography Good-Bye to All That, Sassoon's 'Sherston trilogy' of fictionalised autobiographies (as "Dick Tiltwood") and several other poems by both men.

References

External links
Entry on the Commonwealth War Graves Commission Debt of Honour Register
West Wales War Memorial Project: Llanedy

1895 births
1916 deaths
British Army personnel of World War I
British Army personnel killed in World War II
Military personnel from Swansea
Royal Welch Fusiliers officers
People educated at Christ College, Brecon